MAFB can refer to:
 MAFB, a human gene that encodes the MafB transcription factor
 March Joint Air Reserve Base (March Air Force Base)
 Maxwell Air Force Base in Montgomery, Alabama
 Minot Air Force Base in Minot, North Dakota
 Moody Air Force Base in Valdosta, Georgia